An Express Cruiser is a fast cruising boat.  To distinguish it from a cabin cruiser boat, it has a full head, a galley, sleeping space with two to six berths. There are large open areas near the steering area and in the back of the boat.

There can be one or two powerful engines and it can be a good family boat for outings up to a couple of days when the relatively cramped indoor areas start to become confining.

Express cruisers range in size from 25 feet to 45 feet.

An Express Cruiser does not usually have a Fly Bridge/Flying Bridge and usually looks sleek and 'sporty' with the design being biased more towards performance rather than luxurious/spacious accommodation.

References

External links
Rinker Boats, a boat manufacturer that uses the marketing term Express Cruiser

Motorboats